Copablepharon canariana is a species of moth in the family Noctuidae (owlet moths). The species was described by James Halliday McDunnough in 1932. It is found in North America.

The MONA or Hodges number for Copablepharon canariana is 10682.

References

Further reading
 Lafontaine, J. Donald & Schmidt, B. Christian (2010). "Annotated check list of the Noctuoidea (Insecta, Lepidoptera) of North America north of Mexico". ZooKeys. vol. 40, 1-239.
 Arnett, Ross H. (2000). American Insects: A Handbook of the Insects of America North of Mexico. CRC Press.

External links
Butterflies and Moths of North America

Noctuinae